The Symphony No. 6 in E-flat minor, Op. 111, by Sergei Prokofiev was completed and premiered in 1947. According to Simon Morrison, its premiere was the "last unhampered, unmediated success" the composer would ever experience.

Background 
 reported that the composer had begun sketching out what eventually became the Sixth Symphony before he had embarked upon composing the Fifth. Prokofiev himself declared that work on the Sixth and its predecessor had overlapped, calling both symphonies "distractions" from his unfinished opera Khan Buzai. The first extant sketches for the Sixth are dated to June 23, 1945. The sketch score was completed on October 9, 1946, whereupon he set it down for several weeks before starting the orchestration on December 10. Prokofiev completed the symphony on February 18, 1947. He briefly considered dedicating the symphony to the memory of Ludwig van Beethoven. Although the symphony shares the same opus number as Beethoven's final piano sonata, one of Prokofiev's favorite works, Nestyev said that the dedication was borne from "a desire to carry on the tradition of lofty intellectualism and profound tragedy that characterized Beethoven's later works."

In the weeks following the symphony's completion, Alexander Gauk had indicated that he was eager to premiere it. Despite his interest, Prokofiev invited Yevgeny Mravinsky to hear his new symphony. After listening to Prokofiev's playthrough, Mravinsky praised the music's scope. He told the composer's companion, Mira Mendelson, that the music sounded as if it had "spanned one horizon to the other." He immediately requested to lead the premiere.

On October 8, 1947, Prokofiev arrived in Leningrad to assist Mravinsky in the rehearsals with the Leningrad Philharmonic. The world premiere of the Sixth took place three days later on October 11, at the end of a program which also included music by Tchaikovsky. After the concert, Mravinsky confided to Prokofiev and Mendelson that the performance of the symphony was marred by a number of instrumental mishaps which had left him unhappy and unable to sleep. The following night, after attending a performance at the Kirov Opera of his War and Peace, Prokofiev left with his companion to hear the second performance of his Sixth Symphony. This time the orchestra played the score flawlessly. Prokofiev and Mravinsky both took several curtain calls during which they were photographed together.

Instrumentation 

Woodwinds
Piccolo
2 Flutes
2 Oboes
Cor anglais
E Clarinet
2 Clarinets
Bass clarinet
2 Bassoons
Contrabassoon

Brass
4 Horns
3 Trumpets
3 Trombones
Tuba
Percussion
Timpani
Bass drum
Cymbals (crash and suspended)
Snare drum
Triangle
Tamtam
Tambourine
Wood block

Keyboard
Piano
Celesta
Strings
Harp
Violins (1st and 2nd)
Violas
Cellos
Double basses

Music 

The symphony consists of three movements:

A typical performance lasts approximately 42 minutes.

Prokofiev prepared a brief description of the symphony ahead of its world premiere:

The first movement is agitated, at times lyrical, at times austere; the second movement, "Largo," is brighter and more tuneful; the finale, rapid and in a major key, is close in character to my Fifth Symphony, save for reminiscences of the austere passages in the first movement.

Nestyev recalled that in October 1947 the composer had told him the symphony had been conceived as a reflection on the destruction of the recently concluded Great Patriotic War:

Now we are rejoicing in our great victory, but each of us has wounds that cannot be healed. One has lost those dear to him, another has lost his health. These must not be forgotten.

During the rehearsals for the symphony, Prokofiev described to his wife the "reminiscences" which appear near the finale's coda as "questions cast into eternity." After her repeated requests to elaborate on their meaning, the composer replied: "What is life?" Nestyev described the finale as being "in the spirit of Mozart or Glinka," but that its cheerful mood was dispelled by the invasion of a "titan" whose "incessantly repeated fanfares" reawaken the tragic sonorities from earlier in the symphony.

Reception 
In the weeks prior to the Sixth Symphony's world premiere, Prokofiev's biographer Nestyev and music critic Grigori Shneyerson complained that the composer was being "stingy" with explanations of a work they and the musicians of the Leningrad Philharmonic found difficult. The former would later write that in this symphony Prokofiev "once again began to speak in a very difficult and at times esoteric language." Nikolai Myaskovsky, the composer's colleague and longtime friend, also found the symphony challenging: "I began to understand the Prokofiev [Sixth Symphony] only on the third hearing and then I was won over: profound, but somewhat gloomy, and harshly orchestrated."

The debut of the Sixth Symphony was acclaimed by audiences and critics. "It is wonderful, better than the usual Prokofiev," Shneyerson told Alexander Werth before the symphony's Moscow premiere. "It is philosophic, has the depth of Shostakovich. You'll see!" Likewise, Nestyev wrote in Sovietskoye Iskusstvo that the symphony depicted a "nerve-wracking juxtaposition" of the "private world of modern man against the terrifying machinery of universal destruction," adding that its "noble humanism" placed it alongside the Eighth Symphony of Shostakovich. The music critic of Leningradskaya Pravda praised the symphony as "another stunning victory for Soviet art," adding that "the optimism of this [work], its strong-willed intonations, character, and lyricism reflect the many facets of our people."  Musicologist Yuri Weinkop elicited Prokofiev's approval by comparing the symphony's opening to the scrape of a rusty key turning in a door lock, before revealing a "world of warmth, affection, and beauty."

Nevertheless, the Sixth was among the works excoriated by Andrei Zhdanov and Tikhon Khrennikov the following year during their campaign against formalism in music. The latter lambasted what he perceived as its composer's inability to keep the symphony's "lively and limpid ideas" from being drowned in "contrived chaotic groanings," ultimately dismissing it as a "failure." Nestyev reversed his earlier approval, now decrying the symphony as "clearly formalist," an about-face which Atovmyan openly criticized. Nestyev later described the symphony as a "contest for complexity" which "made it difficult to grasp." Prokofiev felt deeply betrayed by Nestyev, whom he dubbed a "Judas," and permanently severed his friendship with him.

After Prokofiev's death, the Sixth was again reevaluated by Soviet critics during the Khrushchev Thaw. Aram Khachaturian listed it among the works in which he felt that the composer maintained his "guiding principle" of "service to his people, to mankind." Boris Yarustovsky called the symphony a "true war symphony," ascribing to its predecessor only a "general feeling of patriotism," and opining that the work's numbering fated it to its tragic cast which "resemble almost all Russian sixth symphonies"; while Genrikh Orlov extolled it as "an outstanding symphony of our time." While maintaining his previous criticisms of the symphony, Nestyev also wrote that it was "not only an important event in the creative history of an outstanding musician, but also a unique artistic monument of its time."

Abroad reaction to the Sixth was initially mixed. Upon its 1949 American premiere played by the New York Philharmonic under the direction of Leopold Stokowski, Musical America called the Sixth "the most personal, the most accessible, and emotionally revealing work of Prokofiev that has yet been played in this country." In response to the Swiss premiere in 1951, Robert-Aloys Mooser attacked the Sixth as another of Prokofiev's "insane, base compositions" and that the Orchestre de la Suisse Romande was jeopardizing its reputation by playing it. A brief obituary for Prokofiev which was published in the spring 1953 issue of Tempo said that the Sixth's large-scale architecture and attempts at optimism "did not really suit his talent." However, another critic writing in the same magazine 17 years later called the Sixth the "great, crowning" work of Prokofiev's symphonic output.

References

Cited sources

External links 
 

Symphonies by Sergei Prokofiev
1947 in the Soviet Union
1947 compositions
Compositions in E-flat minor